Albu was a rural municipality of Estonia, in Järva County.

Villages
Albu Parish had 16 villages:

Ageri - Ahula - Albu - Järva-Madise - Kaalepi - Lehtmetsa - Mägede - Mõnuvere - Neitla - Orgmetsa - Peedu - Pullevere - Seidla - Soosalu - Sugalepa - Vetepere

Gallery

External links
 

 
Former municipalities of Estonia